Arthur Coggshall Weaver (April 7, 1879 – March 23, 1917) was a Major League Baseball player. He was born in Wichita, Kansas, and died in Denver, Colorado.

Asthma-related complications brought Weaver's career to a premature end, and contributed to his early death at the age of 37.

References

External links

1879 births
1917 deaths
Major League Baseball catchers
St. Louis Cardinals players
Pittsburgh Pirates players
St. Louis Browns players
Chicago White Sox players
Baseball players from Wichita, Kansas
Minor league baseball managers
Cedar Rapids Rabbitts players
Omaha Omahogs players
Cedar Rapids Rabbits players
Minneapolis Millers (baseball) players
Indianapolis Indians players
Terre Haute Hottentots players
Wichita Jobbers players
Denver Grizzlies (baseball) players
Salt Lake City Skyscrapers players
Great Falls Electrics players
Boise Irrigators players
Deaths from asthma